San Diego State University (SDSU) is a public research university in San Diego, California. Founded in 1897 as San Diego Normal School, it is the third-oldest university and southernmost in the 23-member California State University (CSU) system. In Fall 2022, SDSU hit an all time high enrollment record student body of nearly 37,000 and an alumni base of more than 300,000.

It is classified among "R2: Doctoral Universities – High research activity". In the 2015–16 fiscal year, the university obtained $130 million in public and private funding—a total of 707 awards—up from $120.6 million the previous fiscal year. As reported by the Faculty Scholarly Productivity Index released by the Academic Analytics organization of Stony Brook, New York, SDSU had the highest research output of any small research university in the United States in 2006 and 2007. SDSU sponsors the second-highest number of Fulbright Scholars in the State of California, just behind UC Berkeley. Since 2005, the university has produced over 65 Fulbright student scholars.

The university generates over $2.4 billion annually for the San Diego economy, while 60 percent of SDSU graduates remain in San Diego, making SDSU a primary educator of the region's work force. Committed to serving the diverse San Diego region, SDSU has one of the ten most ethnically and racially diverse student bodies among universities nationwide, and is also one of the top ten for the number of bachelor's degrees conferred upon minority students.

San Diego State University is accredited by the Western Association of Schools and Colleges. San Diego State is an Hispanic-serving institution (HSI) and is eligible to be designated as an Asian American Native American Pacific Islander serving institution (AANAPISI).

History

Established on March 13, 1897, San Diego State University first began as the San Diego Normal School, and was initially meant to educate local women as elementary school teachers. It was located on a  campus on Park Boulevard in University Heights (now the headquarters of the San Diego Unified School District). It opened with seven faculty members and 91 students; at first, the curriculum was limited to English, history and mathematics. In 1923, the San Diego Normal School became San Diego State Teachers College, "a four-year public institution controlled by the California State Board of Education." 

By the 1930s the school had outgrown its original campus. In 1931 it moved to its current location on Montezuma Mesa at what was then the eastern edge of San Diego. In 1935, the school expanded its offerings beyond teacher education and became San Diego State College. In 1960, San Diego State College became a part of the California State Colleges system, now known as The California State University. Finally in 1972, San Diego State College became California State University, San Diego, and in 1974 San Diego State University (SDSU).

John F. Kennedy, then the President of the United States, gave the graduation commencement address at the then-San Diego State College on June 6, 1963. Kennedy was given an honorary doctorate degree in law at the ceremony, making SDSC the first California State College to award an honorary doctorate. In 1964, this event was registered as California Historical Landmark #798.

On May 29, 1964, civil rights leader Martin Luther King Jr. addressed a near-capacity audience in the Open Air Theater.  King discussed his vision for the future and called for the passage of the
Civil Rights Act of 1964, then being debated in the Senate.

In April 2012, the XIV Dalai Lama spoke at SDSU's Viejas Arena as part of his "Compassion Without Borders" tour.

After the departure of the San Diego Chargers for Los Angeles in 2017, SDSU endeavored to gain control of the city stadium (then called Qualcomm Stadium) and surrounding city property, which is just across the freeway from the main campus and where SDSU football games are played. The proposal, called SDSU West, was put to city voters in November 2017 where it won approval by 54% of those voting, easily beating out a competing commercial proposal called SoccerCity. Negotiations began for SDSU to purchase the property from the city of San Diego. On May 29, 2020, the city council gave conceptual approval to sell 135 acres, including the stadium, to San Diego State for $88 million. SDSU broke ground for a new 35,000-seat stadium in August 2020. The stadium, which will open in September 2022 as Snapdragon Stadium, will house SDSU football games as well as other NCAA games, professional soccer and special events such as concerts.

University presidents

SDSU has had 10 presidents, 2 of whom served in an acting capacity. Several structures on the campus are named in past presidents' honor, such as Hardy Tower, Hepner Hall (integrated in the university's logo), and the Malcolm A. Love Library. In March 2017 President Hirshman announced his resignation for June 30, 2017; he will assume the position of president at Stevenson University in Maryland. Sally Roush was the interim president until January 31, 2018. On that date, the CSU Board of Trustees appointed Adela de la Torre to serve as the permanent President. She is the first woman to serve in the role on a permanent basis.

 Samuel T. Black (1898–1910)
 Edward L. Hardy (1910–35)
 Walter R. Hepner (1935–52)
Malcolm Love (1952–71)
 Donald E. Walker (1971–72, acting)
 Brage Golding (1972–77)
 Trevor Colbourn (1977–78, acting)
Thomas B. Day (1978–96)
 Stephen L. Weber (1996–2011)
Elliot Hirshman (2011–17)
 Sally Roush (2017–18, acting)
Adela de la Torre (2018–present)

Academics
The university awards 190 bachelor's degrees, 91 master's degrees, and 30 doctoral degrees, including EdD, DPT, JD, AuD, DNP, and PhD programs in collaboration with other universities. SDSU also offers 26 different teaching credentials. The university offers more doctoral degrees than any other campus in the entire California State University, while also enrolling the largest student body of doctoral students in the system. In 2015, SDSU enrolled the most doctoral students in its entire history.

Campus
Several buildings are listed on the National Register of Historic Places:
 Scripps Cottage was finished in September 1931, funded with a donation of $6,000 from Ellen Browning Scripps matched with $5,000 from the state. It was the headquarters for the Associated Women Students and was used for meetings, women's activities, and served as a lounge. On September 3, 1968, the building was moved to make room for the new school. It was used mainly as a conference and meeting building, and in 1993, began serving as a center for international students. With the first phase of the restoration complete, Scripps Cottage is again available for meetings, celebrations and other functions. In fiscal 2016, more than 170 events were held at the site, bringing in a total of 12,000 people.
 The area next to Scripps Cottage is home to a campus famous turtle pond, also known as the Christopher "Toph" H memorial turtle pond. While this pond is known among students as the turtle pond, the university actually intended it to be a Koi Pond only, and the turtles are unwelcome guests left abandoned by previous owners. Nevertheless, the turtle pond remains a key staple of the campus.
Aztec Bowl, costing $500,000 to construct, was dedicated on October 3, 1936, before 7,500 people. The stadium was initially supposed to be expanded to 45,000 seats, but instead was only expanded once with 5,000 seats in 1948. Viejas Arena (originally known as Cox Arena) was constructed over part of the Aztec Bowl, opening in July 1997.
 The CalCoast Credit Union Open Air Theatre (formerly The Greek Bowl and the Open Air Theatre) was financed by the Works Progress Administration and the state for $200,000 and originally dedicated on May 3, 1941.
Hepner Hall took on its current name on January 19, 1976, when the Montezuma Mesa building was renamed to honor Walter R. Hepner Hall. On May 1, 1977, the Humanities building was named after John Adams, a professor, administrator, and archivist. The Humanities-Social Sciences building was renamed in 1986 after geographer Alvena Storm and historian Abraham P. Nasatir.
Peterson Gymnasium was finished in 1961, making the original gym the Women's Gym until it was remodeled and reopened in 1990 as the Physical Education building.
In 1986, a large student apartment complex was added along with an 11-story $13 million residence hall (University Towers, on the west side of campus).
Hardy Memorial Tower, in the Mission Revival style, resembles a Spanish bell tower and is one of the most recognizable buildings on campus. It houses the campanile chimes but also originally concealed a 5000-gallon water tank for the campus plumbing system. The building housed the university's first library, which featured murals painted by the Works Progress Administration.
 The WPA Mission Revival Communications building, Exercise and Nutritional Sciences, Faculty-Staff Club, Life Sciences building and Annex, Little Theatre, Physical Plant Boiler Shop, and the Physical Science building are also listed on the National Register.

Other buildings on campus include:

 The campus library, now known as the Malcolm A. Love Library, acquired its 100,000th book on May 21, 1944. By the end of World War II it was adding about 8,000 books a year. In 1952, the library had 125,000 books, and state regulations required that old books be eliminated before new ones could be added. By 1965, there were more than 300,000 books housed in a library that could hold 230,000. This was ranked highest in state colleges in terms of library size. In the 1960s, construction of a new library began, which required the relocation of Scripps Cottage. In February 1971, the library opened, housing 700,000 books, and was named after President Malcolm A. Love for his popularity on campus and his role in bringing State to university status. Governor Ronald Reagan said the library would "... serve as a lasting memorial to the man who led the college through its growing pains ... to one of the finest state colleges in California". The building was five stories high and was the largest building on campus. A four-story kinetic (and sound) sculpture entitled "Hanging Discus" by sculptor George Baker was specifically designed for the library and added to the interior staircase in November 1973.
 The Conrad Prebys Aztec Student Union Student Union (formerly Aztec Center) secured financing in 2010 and was completed in March 2014, replacing and approximately doubling the size of the Student Union. The facility is the first student union in the United States to qualify for LEED Platinum distinction.
 The $11 million Parma Payne Goodall Alumni Center opened in October 2009 and is home to the SDSU Alumni Association and the Campanile Foundation.
 In 2014, SDSU opened the newly renovated social sciences complex, Storm and Nasatir Halls. Originally built in 1957, the 137,700 square foot complex received a complete makeover to house eight academic departments from the College of Arts & Letters, newly upgraded classrooms, faculty offices, research facilities, two large lecture halls, and a food service facility. Total cost for the construction neared $74 million, began in 2012, and was completed in 2014. Included in the opening were two new named facilities: Charles Hostler Hall (a 435-seat lecture auditorium) and the J. Keith Behner and Catherine M. Stiefel Auditorium (a 252-seat lecture hall). 
Storm Hall was named in honor of geography department professor Alvena Storm, who served as department chair, and on the faculty for over 40 years since 1926. Nasatir Hall was named for Abraham P. Nasatir, a professor emeritus of history who taught at SDSU for 46 years (1928–74) and was later internationally recognized for his research on California history, receiving four Fulbright Fellowships.

Residence halls

In 1937, Quetzal Hall, the first dormitory, opened for 40 women students and was located off campus. In 1968, the coed dorm Zura Hall was built, and more rooms were added later. Chapultepec Hall held 580 students when first built.

Today, the university owns and operates housing for over 4,100 students in residence halls and student apartments, fraternity row, and language and honors housing. There are over 15 dorms on campus, and more under construction. Approximately 63 percent of first-time freshmen live in on-campus housing, while about 14 percent of the overall student body resides in on-campus housing. SDSU offers themed living communities in the freshman and upperclassman housing, such as "pathways for transfers", "gender-neutral housing", and "explore San Diego".

Off-campus facilities

Mount Laguna Observatory

Since 1968, SDSU's Astronomy Department has owned the Mount Laguna Observatory located in the Cleveland National Forest.

Biological field stations
Operated by the SDSU College of Sciences:
 Santa Margarita Ecological Reserve
 Sky Oaks Field Station
 Fortuna Mountain Research Reserve
 Tijuana River National Estuarine Research Reserve

Coastal and Marine Institute Laboratory (CMIL)

The Coastal and Marine Institute Laboratory (CMIL), formerly known as the Coastal Waters Laboratory, is an academic laboratory operated by the SDSU College of Sciences. It is located on a coastal site on the grounds of the old San Diego Naval Training Center (now part of Liberty Station).

Branch campuses

Imperial Valley Campus
SDSU operates a branch campus, the Imperial Valley Campus (IVC) located in Calexico, California, with an additional campus in Brawley, California. IVC includes a research park and related facilities. The campus originally served only upper division, teacher certification, and graduate students but now serves a selective cohort of freshmen and sophomores pursuing degrees in criminal justice, liberal studies, or psychology.

SDSU–Georgia campus

SDSU-Georgia is a branch campus located in Tbilisi, Georgia, in the former Soviet Republic of Georgia. SDSU-Georgia is run in conjunction with three Georgian universities: Georgian Technical University (GTU), Ilia State University (ISU), and Tbilisi State University (TSU). The SDSU-Georgia branch campus is offering courses leading to science, technology, engineering, and mathematics (STEM) bachelor's degrees.

Former branch campus locations
SDSU formerly operated a campus in North County (San Diego area), which was later converted into California State University San Marcos. In the South Bay, SDSU operated a campus in National City, California. This campus shared facilities with Southwestern College. The South Bay Campus is now closed indefinitely.

Student body

San Diego State University is consistently one of the most applied-to universities in the United States, receiving over 60,500 undergraduate applications (including transfer and first time freshman) for the fall 2018 semester and accepting nearly 21,300 for an admission rate of 35.1 percent across the university, the third-lowest admission rate in the 23-campus California State University system.

For fall 2021, SDSU received 24,993 applications for transfer admission and accepted 7,312 (an admission rate of 29.3 percent). The average incoming GPA for transfer students was 3.43.

Fall 2018 admitted freshmen had an average high school GPA of 3.93, average ACT score of 27.0, and average SAT score of 1,264 (out of 1,600; the writing section is not considered). 34.36 percent of the 68,897 freshman applicants were admitted for fall 2018.

The university reached its peak enrollment in 1987 with a student body of 35,945 FTES (Full-Time Equivalent Students), which made it at the time the largest university in California and the tenth largest university in the United States. Due to the overwhelming number of students and lack of facilities and majors, The California State University Board of Trustees voted to cap enrollment for SDSU at 33,000. However, in 1993 enrollment dropped to 26,800 (the lowest since 1973) due to a financial crisis. Nonetheless, enrollment has fluctuated through the years and rose back to nearly 35,000 (exceeding the cap) in 2008. For the fall 2016 semester, the university had a total enrollment of 33,778 students – approximately 29,046 undergraduate and 4,732 postgraduate – making it one of the largest research universities in the state of California. In fall 2013, SDSU had the most doctoral students enrolled in its history at 534 students, also the highest amount of doctorate-seeking students enrolled across the 23-campus CSU system.

Rankings and reputation

San Diego State ranked 227th in the U.S. for in-state students in PayScale 2019 "Best Value Colleges", which ranked 2,006 colleges and universities for return on investment (ROI).  According to PayScale'''s projections, SDSU has a 20-year net return on investment of $435,000.Money magazine ranked SDSU 79th in the country out of 739 schools evaluated for its 2020 "Best Colleges for Your Money" edition.U.S. News & World Report 2021 rankings: SDSU is tied for 143rd overall among 389 national universities, tied for 65th among 209 "Top Public Schools", tied for 100th out of 142 "Best Colleges for Veterans", and 153rd out of 180 "Best Value Schools" among national universities in the U.S. The College of Engineering's undergraduate program ranks tied for 102nd out of 206 schools whose highest engineering degree offered is a doctorate.

Academic Ranking of World Universities ranked San Diego State as one of the top 200 world universities for Economics/Business (between 151 and 200).

In Graduate School Rankings, QS Global 200 Business Schools Report ranks SDSU's business college the 80th best in all of North America.QS MBA Rankings. 2018. Bloomberg Businessweek ranked SDSU as #84 among business colleges in the United States. As there are 1656 schools offering business degree programs in the U.S. (529 of which are accredited by AACSB, the bulk of the others by ACBSP), these rankings would put SDSU in the top 5% of American business schools (or the top 15% of American AACSB schools). Its MBA program is also ranked by QS as between the 151st and 200th best in the world.

The Center For World University Rankings ranks San Diego State University as #376 globally and #126 nationally as of 2017. The CWUR rankings place emphasis on alumni employment and quality of teaching, rather than being purely research-based like ARWU's.

SDSU is also a top producer of U.S. Fulbright Scholars, the U.S. government's flagship international educational exchange program. SDSU has had more than 40 students receive Fulbright Scholarships since 2005. The university ranks No. 30 as the nation's best universities for veterans, according to Military Times Edge. SDSU ranks among the top universities for economic and campus ethnic diversity according to U.S. News & World Report's "America's Best Colleges 2012". Nearly 45 percent of all SDSU graduates are the first in their family to receive a college degree.

Internationally, SDSU offers 335 international education programs in 52 countries. Thirty-four SDSU programs now require international experience for graduation. SDSU ranks first in California among universities of its type in California and third among all universities in California for students studying abroad as part of their college experience. SDSU also ranks 22nd among universities nationwide for the number of students studying abroad (Institute of International Education). Since 2000, nearly 12,000 students have studied abroad: a 900 percent increase in that time. SDSU's undergraduate international business program ranks eleventh in the nation, according to U.S. News & World Report's "America's Best Colleges 2012". SDSU is ranked fifth in Sports Management; 23rd in the MBA/MA in Latin American Studies; and 46th in the MBA/Juris Doctor program by Eduniversal for each programs' international outreach and reputation in 2011. SDSU and Universidad Autónoma de Baja California in Mexico offered the first transnational dual degree between the United States and Mexico, in 1994, through the MEXUS/International Business program. SDSU's international business program also runs transnational dual degree programs with Brazil, Canada, Chile, and Mexico. SDSU's Language Acquisition Resource Center is one of nine sites selected by the U.S. Department of Education to serve as a National Language Resource Center.

SDSU is home to the first-ever MBA program in Global Entrepreneurship. As part of the program, students study at four universities worldwide, including the United States, China, the Middle East, and India. Corporate partners include Qualcomm, Invitrogen, Intel, Microsoft, and KPMG. In 1970, SDSU founded the first women's studies program in the country.

Modern Healthcare ranked SDSU second for graduate schools for physician executives in relation to their Master in Public Health program. SDSU is ranked No. 9 in Fortune Small Business's "America's Best Colleges For Entrepreneurs".

In 2016, San Diego State University's Conrad Prebys Aztec Student Union has achieved LEED Double Platinum status, joining an elite group of energy-efficient buildings. The recognition is shared by fewer than two dozen facilities around the world.

Organization and administration

Schools and colleges
SDSU comprises three Liberal Arts colleges:
 College of Arts & Letters
 College of Sciences
 College of Professional Studies & Fine Arts
and five vocational colleges,
 Global Campus (and American Language Institute)
 Fowler College of Business
 College of Education
 College of Engineering
 College of Health & Human Services (including the Graduate School of Public Health)
It is also home to the Weber Honors College.

SDSU has two named schools established in the university by permanent endowments:
 L. Robert Payne School of Hospitality and Tourism Management
 Charles W. Lamden School of Accountancy

Additionally, SDSU has 11 focused schools:
 School of Communication
 School of Public Affairs
 School of Music and Dance
 School of Art and Design
 School of Exercise and Nutritional Science
 School of Social Work
 Graduate School of Public Health
 School of Journalism and Media Studies
 School of Nursing
 School of Speech, Language, and Hearing Sciences
 School of Theatre, Television, and Film

Endowment

The financial endowment of SDSU is valued at $353.2 million as of 2021.  The primary philanthropic arm of San Diego State University is The Campanile Foundation, controlled by the University Advancement division of the university. The San Diego State University Research Foundation, an auxiliary corporation owned and controlled by the university, is the manager and administrator of all philanthropic funds and external funding for the university and its affiliated and auxiliary foundations and corporations.

As of June 30, 2021, permanent assets of the SDSU Campanile Foundation totaled over $520 million.

For the 2004–2005 academic year, SDSU received over US$157 million in external funding from grants and contracts, as well as an additional US$57 million in donations and charitable giving. For 2005–2006, SDSU received US$152 million in grants and contracts to support research. This is followed by US$47.7 million in donations, gifts and other charitable giving.

An auxiliary to The Campanile Foundation is the Aztec Athletic Association, which primarily raises funds for the student athletes in the San Diego State University athletics programs (see discussion of Athletics below and at SDSU Aztecs).

Athletics

SDSU's intercollegiate athletic teams are referred to as the "Aztecs". The university currently sponsors six men's and thirteen women's sports programs at the varsity level.

The first major sport on campus was rowing, but it initially had no coaches or tournaments. Other sports that developed early in the campus's history were tennis, basketball, golf, croquet, and baseball. Early on, the school's football program had such a limited selection of players that faculty had to be used to fill the roster. When the college merged with the junior college in 1921, the college became a member of the Junior College Conference. After the school won most of the conference titles in a variety of sports, the league requested that college leave out of fairness to the smaller schools. For its football program, the team outscored its opponents 249 to 52 in ten games, resulting in the first sales of season tickets in 1923. From 1925 to 1926, the college played as an independent. It then joined the Southern California Conference in 1926, where it did not win a football conference championship until 1936. However, in other sports including tennis and basketball, it excelled. The college remained with the conference until 1939, when it joined the California Collegiate Athletic Association.

The basketball team reached and won multiple championship games during the 1930–1940s, including a conference title in 1931, 1934, 1937, and 1939. It reached the national championship in 1939 and 1940, losing in the final rounds. However, in 1941 the college returned and won the college's first national title. In track, the team won conference titles in 1935, 1936, 1937, 1938, and 1939. The football team won conference titles in 1936 and 1937, and the baseball team won three conference titles and placed second three times between 1935 and 1941.

In 1955, the Aztec Club was established and raised $20,000 a year by 1957. The club worked in increasing athletic scholarships, hiring better coaches, and developing the college's intercollegiate athletic programs. In 1956, students approved through a vote of allowing a mandatory student activity fee, with a portion going to athletics. By the end of the decade the budget had doubled to $40,000. The campus's most successful sports program during the 1950s was cross-country, when the team won eight straight conference titles and AAU regional titles and placed high in national competitions. Basketball teams ranged from last in the conference to multiple conference, regional, and national appearances. The football program had its first undefeated team in 1951, but in the last part of the decade earned the worst records in the school's football program under the direction of head coach Paul Governali.

Under Governali, the campus's football program suffered due to Governali's policy of not recruiting players. To improve the program, Love hired in 1961 Don Coryell, who led the program win three consecutive championships (1966–68), and 104 wins, 19 losses, and 2 ties by the time he left SDSU. Coryell was assisted by John Madden, Joe Gibbs, and Rod Dowhower, among others. In Coryell's first year, attendance at home games averaged 8,000 people, but by 1966 it had doubled to 16,000. This later jumped to 26,000–41,000 per game with the addition of the new San Diego Stadium. At some games, attendance was larger than at San Diego Chargers games. There were several undefeated seasons and many players broke records for most catches, touchdowns, and passing yards. In 1969, San Diego State College moved into NCAA Division I, leaving the California Collegiate Athletic Association. In 1972, Coyrell left to pursue coaching in the NFL.

Basketball also did well, with the 1967–68 team being ranked the number one college-level team in the nation, although it did not win a national title. The Aztecs also won the 1960 CCAA baseball title and multiple national championships throughout the 1960s in track, cross country, and swimming.

By 1970–71, the campus had 14 NCAA sports. The 1973 men's volleyball team won the NCAA national championship which was the first NCAA national title since moving to Division I status.

SDSU competes in NCAA Division I FBS. Its primary conference is the Mountain West Conference; its women's rowing team competes in the American Athletic Conference, its women's water polo team participates in the Golden Coast Conference, and its men's soccer team is a single-sport member of the Pac-12 Conference (Pac-12). The ice hockey team competes in the ACHA with other western region club teams (www.sdsuhockey.com). The crew team's championship regatta is in the WIRA (Western International Rowing Association). The university colors are scarlet (red) and black, SDSU's athletic teams are called the "Aztecs", and its mascot is the Aztec Warrior, formerly referred to as "Monty Montezuma".

Baseball and softball

The baseball team plays at Tony Gwynn Stadium on the SDSU campus, opened in 1997 and named after former SDSU baseball and basketball player, late baseball head coach, and Major League Baseball first ballot Hall of Fame inductee Tony Gwynn, who played his entire professional career with the San Diego Padres. The playing field is officially called Charlie Smith Field, after the longtime SDSU baseball head coach Charles R. Smith.

The softball team plays at the SDSU Softball Stadium, completed in 2005 adjacent to Tony Gwynn Stadium.

Basketball

The men's and women's basketball teams play at Viejas Arena, opened in 1997, on the SDSU campus. The court is officially named Steve Fisher Court, after longtime SDSU basketball head coach Steve Fisher. Both teams practice at the Jeff Jacobs JAM Center, a basketball practice facility that opened on campus in 2015.

Football

The football team practices at the main campus and currently plays its games at Snapdragon Stadium in Mission Valley (formerly SDCCU Stadium). In November 2018, a San Diego ballot initiative passed which gave SDSU the right to purchase and redevelop the SDCCU Stadium site.

The Fresno State–San Diego State football rivalry is between the Fresno State Bulldogs and San Diego State Aztecs. The winner of the game receives the "Old Oil Can" trophy.

Soccer

The men's and women's soccer teams both play on campus at the SDSU Sports Deck, a facility opened in 2000 that also hosts the women's track and field team. The women compete in the Mountain West Conference while the men compete in the Pac-12 Conference. In 1987, the men's team reached the NCAA Division I Men's Championship final, losing to the Clemson Tigers.

Volleyball

The women's volleyball team plays at Peterson Gymnasium's Aztec Court on the SDSU campus. 
The former men's volleyball team won the 1973 NCAA men's volleyball tournament (SDSU's first and only NCAA Division I national championship to date in any sport), but the program was disbanded in 2000 due to budgetary constraints and necessity to maintain compliance with Title IX regulations.

Other sports

 The SDSU Sports Deck is home to both the men's and women's soccer teams as well as the women's track & field team. The facility, opened in 2000, is located atop a two-story university parking structure and includes a natural grass soccer field with a built-in automatic drainage system, surrounded by a track (often dubbed the "Aztrack").
The women's swimming and diving and women's water polo teams are both based at the on-campus aquatic sports complex, known as the Aztec Aquaplex. The facility was opened in 2007 and includes an Olympic-size swimming pool with a moveable bulkhead, a separate recreational pool, and a hydrotherapy spa. This facility also serves as the recreational pool for SDSU students and community members.
Both the men's and women's tennis teams play at the Aztec Tennis Center, a 12-court facility opened in 2005 on the western edge of the main campus
A non-varsity club program, Aztecs rugby was founded in 1958. The rugby club fields both men's and women's teams; the men compete in Division 1-A in the California conference and the women play in the Pacific Desert conference of Division II. The Aztec men's team won the US National Collegiate Rugby Championship in 1987.
Other non-varsity aquatic sports are based out of the Mission Bay Aquatic Center (MBAC) in Mission Bay, just a few miles west of the main campus. The Associated Students organization of San Diego State University, in conjunction with the University of California, San Diego recreation, owns and operates the MBAC. The facility provides opportunities for many outdoor activities and water sports for SDSU students.

Student life

Media, newspapers, and magazines

Students began publishing The White and Gold in 1902, which was a literary magazine and newspaper. In 1913, a new newspaper was established entitled Normal News Weekly. The school newspaper Paper Lantern (Normal News Weekly was renamed after the addition of the junior college) became The Aztec in September 1925. It was later expanded to its current name, The Daily Aztec in fall 1959. The school's annual yearbook was named Del Sudoeste (Spanish for "of the southwest") in the early 1920s. The Koala, a comedy newspaper that is widely known around the San Diego State area, is also distributed monthly on campus but is not directly connected to the school at the moment.

SDSU media and publications
San Diego State University Press
 The oldest university press in the California State University system with noted specializations in Border Studies, Critical Theory, Latin American Studies, and Cultural Studies
 KCR (SDSU) College Radio
 Student-run broadcast radio station for the SDSU community
 "The Sound of State"
 KPBS Public Broadcasting TV/FM
 Television, digital television, and FM radio for the San Diego community
 An affiliate of the Public Broadcasting Service (PBS) network
 "A Broadcasting Service of San Diego State University"
 360 Magazine
 The quarterly SDSU alumni and San Diego community magazine
Montezuma Publishing
A not-for-profit organization specializing in producing course materials to serving the undergraduate and graduate students of SDSU

SDSU campus newspapers

The Daily Aztec, the largest daily collegiate newspaper in California, publishing daily since 1960
The Koala, an independent satirical collegiate newspaper distributed on campus

Clubs
Initial clubs that were first started on campus including the Debating Club, the Associated Student Body, YWCA, and in 1906, An Alumni Association. The oldest club on campus was The Rowing Association.

Formula SAEAztec Racing is SDSU's Society of Automotive Engineers (SAE) student chapter. Every year, SDSU engineering students design and construct an open wheel, open cockpit race car to Formula SAE (formerly Formula Society of Automotive Engineers) specifications. Aztec Racing then competes against other universities' Formula SAE teams in an annual competition event, where the cars are raced against each other and judged on design. Attendance at Formula SAE competition is international, with several hundreds of schools competing each year. Students from other majors participate as well, frequently in the areas of management, promotion and other aspects of the project.

Greek life

Fraternities and sororities have been a part of the San Diego State University campus community for over a century. Today SDSU is home to many recognized Greek-letter organizations, most of which belonging to one of four university-sponsored governing councils.

The Interfraternity Council (IFC) currently consists of 14 active social fraternities. The College Panhellenic Association (CPA) is made up of 9 active social sororities.
 	

 	
SDSU's Greek system also includes several multi-cultural Greek organizations. The United Sorority & Fraternity Council (USFC) is the governing body for 17 culturally-based Greek-letter organizations (7 fraternities, 11 sororities) and the National Pan-Hellenic Council (NPHC) is the governing body of historically African American Greek-letter organizations at SDSU (currently 3 fraternities and 3 sororities).

On April 27, 1974, The Phi Beta Kappa Honor Society established an SDSU chapter. It was the first in the CSU system as well as the San Diego area.

Other multidisciplinary national honor societies include Phi Kappa Phi, Mortar Board, and Phi Eta Sigma.

 LGBT-Friendly campus 
San Diego State University was recognized in 2016 among the best universities in the nation for supporting LGBT students. The Campus Pride Index recently ranked SDSU on its 2016 "Best of the Best" Top 30 list of LGBTQ-friendly colleges and universities. SDSU has been included in this ranking for the past seven years along with institutions like Princeton University and Cornell University.

SDSU was recognized in 2014 as one of 20 of the most Lesbian, Gay, Bisexual, Transgender-friendly campuses in all of the U.S. The university attains this recognition through its welcome week LGBT reception, Safe Zone ally training, Big Gay BBQs, participating in Aids Walk San Diego and Pride San Diego, hosting an LGBT college fair, and holding a Lavender Graduation ceremony and several lecture series. The university is one of the few campuses in California that is home to the gay social fraternity, Delta Lambda Phi. Additionally, SDSU was the first university in California to offer a major in LGBT studies, while also offering a minor and graduate degree in the discipline. In 2014, SDSU opened a first-ever Pride Center at the former Student Organization Annex, with the mission to provide resources and help meet the needs and challenges of LGBT students.

Traditions

 The San Diego State Marching Aztecs and Pep and Varsity Bands are often seen at many sporting events including Football, Basketball and even Volleyball.
 The San Diego State University (SDSU) campus is known as "Montezuma Mesa", as the university is situated on a mesa overlooking Mission Valley and is located at the intersection of Montezuma Road and College Avenue.

S Mountain
On February 27, 1931, President Hardy permitted 500 students to paint rocks to form a  white S on Cowles Mountain. The idea of "S Mountain" was created by the Council of Twelve and initially supported by Hardy. The giant S was lit at night for the opening football game of a season (performed by the freshman to build school spirit) along with pep rallies, and was repainted throughout its history.Starr, p. 126 At the time, it was the largest collegiate symbol in the world. During World War II, the S was camouflaged to prevent it becoming a reference point for enemy bombing aircraft. It was returned to its normal state in April 1944. In the 1970s students stopped painting it and brush obstructed the symbol. After a 1988 brush fire it was exposed, and students repainted it. In fall 1997, a group of 100 volunteers climbed Cowles Mountain after dusk to commemorate the one hundredth anniversary of the school by using flashlights to once again outline the S on the side of the mountain. In 1990, a high school prank defaced the S to read as "91" in honor of their graduating class.

School colors and history of the Aztec mascot
The initial colors of the school were white and gold. When the junior college was added to the campus in 1921, its colors of blue and gold were merged, resulting in a blue, gold, and white color scheme. New colors were later chosen as gold and purple, until being replaced by scarlet and black on January 28, 1928.

The school's prior nicknames for its mascot included "Normalites", "Professors", and "Wampus Cats". The origin of the Aztec mascot is disputed among historians of the university but the first reported manifestation of the moniker concerned a student, Frederick Osenberg (Class of 1926), who came up with the idea of the San Diego State Aztecs while walking by the California Tower in Balboa Park, and became inspired by various murals of indigenous people from Latin America.” In 1925, the student body voted to adopt the Aztec moniker. The decision to choose the Aztec as a moniker was in conjunction with preliminary plans to move to a new campus and was done in unison with changing the name of the school newspaper to ‘The Aztec’ and featuring a yearbook with prominent Aztec symbols. The mascot transition was first mentioned in the January 21st, 1925 edition of the school's newspaper at the time, The Paper Lantern (1921-1925). In the article, State Adopts New Moniker For Athletes,'' opens with an improvised fight song, "Rah for the Aztecs! What a name! What a name! Did you say Ash cans? Say I thought those cannibals were all dead! Whaddaya think this is? An Indian reservation? I’ll bet Hopis are responsible for this”. The reasoning behind the choice of mascot is also mentioned directly: "We have been called Aztecs and will be called Aztecs in the future. The 'name has' been used to denote a nation of semi-civilized inhabitants of central Mexico. What it will mean in the future remains for us to say. If we build an institution famous for its scholars, for its athletes, for its faculty; if we build a reputation for broadmindedness, for honesty, and for sportsmanship, these attributes will be incorporated into the same Aztecs. On the other hand - but there is no other hand in this picture. We are going to make the Aztecs mean all these finer things. Tradition will know Aztecs as something more than a tribe of semi-civilized inhabitants of Central Mexico...A name should stand for something more than a combination of letters. It should bear traditions, should call up thoughts of courage and fighting spirit. Such a tribe were the Aztecs. Noted for their fleetness, strength and bravery, they were seldom downed in physical encounters. The Aztecs are gone but their spirit and name remains, waiting all these years for State College to assume its burden. Vive la Aztec!”

In 1937,  the artist, Donal Hord, completed "Aztec" for San Diego State College as an artistic representation of the Aztec mascot. The Depression-era Works Project Administration (WPA) partially funded the sculpture, created from a single 2.5-ton block of black diorite. The stone base was presented as a gift to the school by the class of 1937. In 2002, the sculpture was moved to the Prospective Student Center and in 2009, the SDSU Alumni Association installed a large concrete replica in the rotunda of the Parma Payne Goodall Alumni Center. The dedication ceremony included an elaborate dance circle with students, bare-chested, dressed in Plains Indian costumes. This style of performance was seen at the school throughout the mid-century.

The mascot continued to evolve and in 1941, for the first time, a student portrayed an Aztec in a football game skit. The character became known as Monty Montezuma. "The first student to dress up as Monty was Art Munzig, who played the role during the opening football game of the 1941 season.  He and four scantily clad cheerleaders in Plains Indian costumes secretly hid in a makeshift teepee on the sidelines and emerged at halftime with Montezuma chasing the maidens down the track in front of the stands."

In 2000, the SDSU Associated Students’ University Council passed a resolution, backed by the Native American Student Alliance, that called for retiring the Aztec moniker and Montezuma mascot due to racism and culturally insensitivity and President Stephen Weber appoints a task force to make recommendations on the Aztec moniker and Montezuma mascot. This task force recommended updating logos and symbols to be culturally appropriate and historically accurate; defining Montezuma as an ambassador but not as a mascot; educating the university community on Aztec history and culture; and strengthening programs and events that support indigenous communities. The Monty Montezuma mascot was renamed the Ambassador Montezuma in 2002. Ambassador Montezuma debuts to speak on Aztec history and culture at events, but he is poorly received. To keep the tradition of the Montezuma mascot, Alumni form the Aztec Warrior Foundation and unveil an unofficial, more historically accurate Aztec Warrior representation. The school officially retired Ambassador Montezuma shortly after in 2003. During the same year, the Aztec Warrior becomes official through a referendum vote of students and alumni.

In 2010, SDSU briefly debuts Zuma, a jaguar mascot, at football games. The jaguar was retired in 2012.

Throughout the 2010s, the Aztec mascot has continued to be a point of controversy for the school. The last known vote regarding the mascot occurred in 2018. SDSU President Sally Roush appointed a 17-member Aztec Identity Task Force composed of students, faculty, staff, alumni and members at large and reports to the University Senate her decisions to continue the use of the Aztec identity. She also established a governing authority, chaired by the president, to ensure recognition of and reverence for the Aztec civilization become part of daily life at SDSU. President Roush made the decision to discontinue using the Aztec Warrior as a mascot, while retaining it as a "Spirit Leader."

Mascot controversy

Like other mascots referencing historical tribes and cultures, the Aztec mascot has periodically been the topic of question. It was not cited as "hostile and abusive" by the NCAA in 2005. NCAA spokesman Erik Christianson said the organization “accepted the findings from SDSU that it could not find any organized tribe or group related to Aztecs. Then President Weber explained his findings in a letter written on April 27, 2005, to the NCAA’s vice president for education services, Ron Stratten. “As I mentioned in my letter on January 3, 2003, the Aztecs are not a Native American or American Indian culture,” Weber wrote. “However, the Aztecs are central to the cultural heritage of Mexico.” However, the Aztec Warrior has drawn criticism.

Directly following the NCAA Native American mascot decision, the Native American Student Alliance (NASA) posted an official statement about the university mascot on their Facebook page. The statement said the mascot “embodies the existence of institutionalized racism.” A student group leader at the time was quoted voicing concern about the impact of utilizing stereotypical Native clothes, breathing fire and using sacred objects to whip up the crowd. These concerns were also vocalized by NASA in their official statement, where they voiced concern about the impact of the mascot on campus life after a 2009 party hosted by the fraternity Sigma Alpha Epsilon, with the theme “Cowboys and Nava-hoes." Although the school placed the fraternity on probation, President Hirshman's statement about cultural appropriation drew attention to "...all of the performances of racialized stereotypes by faculty and students, baton twirlers in feathered headdresses, students dressed as imagined Indians, faux ceremonies, chants, songs, the names of the dorms, the names of the rooms of the new student union, t-shirts and banners proclaiming “We Are Aztecs”."

Other points of contention have included worry that the mascot teaches the mistaken idea that Aztecs were a local tribe rather than living in Mexico 1,000 miles away.

The SDSU Native American Student Alliance (NASA) continues to support removal of the mascot in an official statements made to the Committee on Diversity, Equity and Outreach. Although that resolution was rejected by the SDSU Associated Students, the University Senate, which represents the administration, faculty, staff and students, had voted to phase out the human depiction of the Aztec Warrior.

In May 2021, the senate of the university opted a vote for commission to replace the human depiction of the Aztec Warrior for at least two animals of the Kumeyaay heritage. The commission would be working alongside local tribe leaders for the decisions leading up to a final replacement mascot.

Incidents

1996 campus shooting

A shooting occurred on campus on August 15, 1996. A 36-year-old graduate engineering student, while apparently defending his thesis, shot and killed his three professors, Constantinos Lyrintzis, Cheng Liang, and D. Preston Lowrey III, at San Diego State University. The shooter, who was suffering from certain mental problems, was convicted on July 19, 1997, and was sentenced to life in prison. As a memorial, tables with a plaque with information about each victim have been placed adjacent to the College of Engineering building.

2008 student drug arrests

On May 6, 2008, the Drug Enforcement Administration announced the arrests of 96 individuals, of whom 33 were San Diego State University students, on a variety of drug charges in a year-long narcotics sting operation dubbed Operation Sudden Fall. It was originally reported that 75 of the arrested were students, but the inflated number included students who had been arrested months earlier, in some cases for simple possession.  The bust, which was the largest in the history of San Diego County, drew a mixed reaction from the community.

2014 sexual assault allegation
In late 2014, SDSU began an "It's on Us" campaign to combat an alarming pattern of sexual violence. In the fall 2014 semester, there were 14 sexual assault allegations reported on or around the college area. In early 2015, SDSU was found to have wrongfully accused a male foreign exchange student of sexual assault during the fall 2014 semester and allegedly failing to afford him due process. The student's name was released in a campus-wide email immediately upon his arrest and he was quickly expelled from the university. Alexa Romano, the female student who made the accusation, later admitted to not being truthful about the alleged incident. The male student later successfully sued the university.

2022 rape allegations
In May 2022, the Los Angeles Times reported that five San Diego State University football players were alleged to have raped a girl at an off-campus house party, leading to accusations that, seven months after the alleged incident, the University has neglected to investigate the issue or begin disciplinary proceedings. University officials responded by saying the San Diego Police Department was investigating the allegations, and that "Revealing any information prematurely would not only compromise the integrity of the case but could be damaging to anyone directly involved with the investigation."

Notable alumni and faculty

San Diego State University has over 260,000 alumni worldwide. The university is one of the top producers of U.S. Student Fulbright Scholars in the nation.

Notes

References

Bibliography

External links 

 
 SDSU Athletics website

 
San Diego
San Diego
Universities and colleges in San Diego
Universities and colleges in San Diego County, California
Historic districts on the National Register of Historic Places in California
Mission Valley, San Diego
National Register of Historic Places in San Diego
University and college buildings on the National Register of Historic Places in California
Schools accredited by the Western Association of Schools and Colleges
Educational institutions established in 1897
1897 establishments in California